Ricardo Israel Peña Franco (born 27 May 1992) is a Mexican professional footballer who plays as a defender for Celaya.

References

External links

1992 births
Living people
Mexican footballers
Association football defenders
Querétaro F.C. footballers
Cimarrones de Sonora players
Club Celaya footballers
Liga MX players
Ascenso MX players
Liga Premier de México players
Footballers from Mexico City